Liviu Hapaină (born 20 April 1978) is a Romanian former footballer who played as a defender for teams such as ARO Câmpulung, Dacia Mioveni or Alro Slatina, among others.

External links

1978 births
Living people
People from Argeș County
Romanian footballers
Association football defenders
Liga I players
Liga II players
CS Mioveni players
FC Internațional Curtea de Argeș players
SCM Râmnicu Vâlcea players
FC Argeș Pitești players